"Foolproof" is a song recorded by Canadian country music group Desert Dolphins. It was released in 1996 as the first single from their debut album, Hang of the Heartache. It peaked at number 10 on the RPM Country Tracks chart in October 1996.

Chart performance

References

1996 songs
1996 singles
Desert Dolphins songs
Songs written by Richard Fagan
Songs written by Kim Williams (songwriter)
Songs written by Ron Harbin